János Szabó (born 11 July 1989) is Hungarian footballer who plays as a defender for Paks.

Club statistics

Updated to games played as of 5 March 2022.

Honours

 FIFA U-20 World Cup:
Third place: 2009

Videos
2011-2012
Video1 
Video2

References

Profile 
Profile 

1989 births
People from Szekszárd
Sportspeople from Tolna County
Living people
Hungarian footballers
Hungary international footballers
Hungary under-21 international footballers
Hungary youth international footballers
Association football defenders
Paksi FC players
BFC Siófok players
Nemzeti Bajnokság I players
Nemzeti Bajnokság II players